Gert Jan Schlatmann (born December 6, 1963) is a former Dutch field hockey player, who earned a total of 50 caps, scoring fourteen goals in the 1980s for the Netherlands national field hockey team.

Schlatmann was born in Bloemendaal, North Holland.  Playing club hockey for HC Bloemendaal, the striker and midfielder was a member of the bronze medal-winning Dutch team at the 1988 Summer Olympics in Seoul.

References
  Dutch Olympic Committee
  KNHB Profile

External links
 

1963 births
Living people
People from Bloemendaal
Dutch male field hockey players
Olympic field hockey players of the Netherlands
Field hockey players at the 1988 Summer Olympics
Olympic bronze medalists for the Netherlands
Olympic medalists in field hockey
Medalists at the 1988 Summer Olympics
HC Bloemendaal players
Sportspeople from North Holland